The College of Media is a college at the University of Illinois Urbana-Champaign, United States. The college name changed from College of Communications to the College of Media in 2008.
 
The College of Media offers Bachelor of Science degrees in Journalism, Advertising, Media and Cinema Studies, and (jointly with the College of Agricultural, Consumer and Environmental Sciences) Agricultural Communications. The college also partners with the Grainger College of Engineering to provide a "CS+" major in advertising which combines the academic study of advertising and computer science. Graduate degrees are offered with Master of Science degrees in Journalism and Advertising. A Doctor in Philosophy in Communications and Media is also available.
 
The U of I College of Media is currently among the top three most selective colleges at the University of Illinois along with the UIUC College of Engineering and the UIUC College of Business, with the median 50% of incoming freshmen scoring between 27–32 on the ACT.
 
The Department of Advertising—the first such academic department in the country—was established at the University of Illinois in 1959. The department was created by Charles Sandage, known as the "father of advertising education." Like virtually every other advertising program that rose in its shadow, it reflected the structure and functions of the modern advertising agency.

Rankings
QS World University Rankings ranked its Media Studies program seventh in the world.
 
The Department of Advertising has been consistently ranked in the top five departments in the country in the past 20 years. Rankings are based on scholarship, and perceptions of peers as well as those of advertising industry personnel.
 
Advertising students at Illinois prepare for all facets of the consumer communications industry. This is what makes the program unique, and it is what repeatedly places it among the top-ranked programs in the country.

Facilities
The College of Media is primarily housed in Gregory Hall. The Richmond Journalism Teaching Studio is also used for broadcast classes. A degree from the College of Media stresses a strong liberal arts background, so students typically take many different classes in areas such as political science, economics, sociology, philosophy, anthropology, natural science, and history.

College units
 Department of Agricultural Communication
 Department of Advertising
 Department of Journalism
CU-CitizenAccess, a community news website 
 Department of Media and Cinema Studies
 Institute of Communications Research
 WILL – AM, FM, TV, and online

Campus opportunities
The University of Illinois offers students opportunities to get a sense of working in journalism while in school. The Urbana-Champaign area has Illini Media, which features the Daily Illini, WPGU Radio, the Illio yearbook, Buzz, www.the217.com, and the Technograph, an engineering magazine that comes out four times a year. Richmond Studio also hosts UI-7 and WILL.

Television stations
 12 WILL-TV, PBS
 UI-7, cable TV service

Radio stations
 580 AM WILL, public radio
 90.9 FM WILL-FM

Notable alumni
Students and alumni have worked for organizations including the Chicago Bears, Chicago White Sox, WGN-TV, Fox TV, Universal Pictures, the Chicago Tribune, the Chicago Sun-Times, the St. Louis Post-Dispatch, Rolling Stone Magazine, CNN, WBBM-TV CBS 2 Chicago, the Champaign News-Gazette, the Associated Press, NBC 5 Chicago, WCIA, WPGU, Illini Media, UI-7, the Big Ten Network, the Chicago Rush, the Chicago Bandits, the Chicago Sky, the Chicago Wolves, the Chicago Storm, the Chicago Slaughter, the Chicago Shamrox, the Northwest Herald, KISS-FM, ESPN Rise magazine, KMOV CBS St. Louis, the NFL Network, and WGN Radio 720.
 
Pulitzer Prize winners
 Barry Bearak, M.S. 1974 – International Reporting, 2002
 Michael Colgrass, B.A. 1956 – Music, 1978
 George Crumb, M.A. 1952 – Music, 1968
 David Herbert Donald, M.A. 1942, Ph.D. 1946 – Biography, 1961 and 1988
 Carl Van Doren, B.A. 1907 – Biography, 1939
 Mark Van Doren, B.A. 1914 – Poetry, 1940
 Roger Ebert, B.S. 1964 – Criticism, 1975
 Glenn Howatt, M.S. 1986 – Pulitzer Prize for Local Reporting, 2013
 Paul Ingrassia, B.S. 1972 – Beat Reporting, 1993
 Allan Nevins, B.A. 1912, M.A. 1913 – Biography, 1933 and 1937
 James Reston, B.S. 1932 – National Reporting, 1945 and 1957
 Robert Lewis Taylor, B.A. 1933 – Fiction, 1959
 George F. Will, B.A. 1933 – Commentary, 1977

Broadcasting and journalism
 Ryan Baker – CBS 2 Chicago sports anchor, B.S. 1991
 Robin Baumgarten – WGN-TV 9 anchor
 Steve Bardo – Big Ten Network announcer
 Jill Carlson – Fox WFLD 32 Chicago sports anchor and reporter
 Roger Ebert – movie critic and author, B.S. 1964
 Rob Elgas – NBC 5 Chicago anchor
 John Foreman – The News-Gazette publisher
 Donald Heimburger – European Traveler/Heimburger House Publishing Company
 Paul Ingrassia – journalist, 1993 Pulitzer Prize winner, M.S. 1972
 Amber Jenne – WCIA 3 reporter and anchor; M.S. Class of 2005
 Rick Kaplan – journalist, has worked for CNN, ABC, and MSNBC; has won 34 Emmys
 Will Leitch – sports writer/author; author of three books, including God Save the Fan, a book of essays; an editor of Deadspin
 Andy Miller – WCIA 3 News Director
 Eric Olson – Daily Chronicle editor
 Christina Peluso – Fox WFLD Chicago 32 writer
 Alex Perez – NBC 5 Chicago reporter
 Ash-har Quraishi – Chief Investigative Reporter for KCTV; Bureau Chief, CNN Pakistan
 Jennifer Roscoe – WCIA 3 anchor

Media
 Robert "Buck" Brown – Playboy cartoonist, creator of the libinous "Granny" character, and whose drawings regularly addressed racial equality issues	
 Dianne Chandler – Playboy Playmate of the Month, 1966
 Judith Ford (Judi Nash), B.S. – Miss America 1969
 Erika Harold – Miss America 2003
 Hugh Hefner, B.A. 1949 – founder of Playboy magazine
 Nicole Hollander, B.A. 1960 – syndicated cartoonist of Sylvia
 Henry Petroski, Ph.D. 1968 – civil engineer and writer
 Irna Phillips, 1923 – creator of the soap opera
 
Reporting and journalism
 Dan Balz, B.A. 1968, M.A. 1972 – The Washington Post national political reporter and editor; author
 B. Peter Bolek – 2005 Daily Southtown
 Chris Britt – editorial cartoonist
 John Chancellor – political analyst and newscaster for NBC Nightly News
 Roger Ebert, B.S. 1964 – film critic
 Bill Geist, 1968 – CBS News correspondent
 Robert Goralski, 1949 – NBC News correspondent
 Bob Grant – radio talk show personality
 Herb Keinon – columnist and journalist for The Jerusalem Post
 Frederick C Klein, B.A. 1959 – sportswriter The Wall Street Journal and author
 Carol Marin, A.B. 1970 – former news anchor, 60 Minutes correspondent, and Illinois Journalist of the Year (1988)	
 Robert Novak, B.A. 1952 – political commentator and columnist
 Ian Punnett – radio talk show personality, and Saturday night host of Coast to Coast AM
 B. Mitchel Reed, B.S., M.A. – popular radio personality in Los Angeles and New York
 Dan Savage – advice columnist (Savage Love) and theater director
 Gene Shalit, 1949 – film critic
 Douglas Wilson – television personality and designer
 
Literature
 Nelson Algren, B.S. 1931 – author of 1950 National Book Award-winning The Man With the Golden Arm
 Ann Bannon, B.A. 1955 – pulp fiction author of "The Beebo Brinker Chronicles"
 Dee Brown, M.S. 1951 – author of Bury My Heart at Wounded Knee
 John F. Callahan, M.A., Ph.D. – literary executor for  Ralph Ellison
 Iris Chang, B.A. 1989 – author of The Rape of Nanking
 Dave Eggers,  attended 1980s and 90s, B.S. 2002 – author of A Heartbreaking Work of Staggering Genius
 Stanley Elkin, B.A. 1952, Ph.D. 1961 – National Book Critics Circle Award winner for George Mills in 1982 and for Mrs. Ted Bliss in 1995
 Lee Falk, 1932 – creator of The Phantom and Mandrake the Magician
 Irene Hunt, B.A. 1939 – Newbery Medal-winning author of Up a Road Slowly
 Richard Powers, M.A. 1979 – novelist
 
Advertising and marketing	
 Helen Min, B.S. 2005, M.S. 2006 – founding member of Facebook and former Head of Vertical Marketing, Global Business Marketing in Facebook, current head of enterprise marketing at Dropbox

References

External links
 
 WILL AM-FM-TV-Online
 

 

 

Educational institutions established in 1927
1927 establishments in Illinois
Media
Journalism schools in the United States